The 2021 Puerto Vallarta Open was a professional tennis tournament played on hard courts. It was the third edition of the tournament which was part of the 2021 ATP Challenger Tour. It took place in Puerto Vallarta, Mexico between 22 and 28 November 2021.

Singles main-draw entrants

Seeds

 1 Rankings are as of 15 November 2021.

Other entrants
The following players received wildcards into the singles main draw:
  Milledge Cossu
  Gerardo López Villaseñor
  Shang Juncheng

The following players received entry into the singles main draw using protected rankings:
  Alexander Sarkissian
  Rubin Statham

The following players received entry into the singles main draw as alternates:
  Martín Cuevas
  Matías Franco Descotte

The following players received entry from the qualifying draw:
  Liam Draxl
  Alex Hernández
  Christian Langmo
  Govind Nanda

Champions

Singles
 
 Daniel Altmaier def.  Alejandro Tabilo 6–3, 3–6, 6–3.

Doubles

 Gijs Brouwer /  Reese Stalder def.  Hans Hach Verdugo /  Miguel Ángel Reyes-Varela 6–4, 6–4.

References

2021 ATP Challenger Tour
2021 in Mexican tennis
November 2021 sports events in Mexico